Aliabad-e Moini (also Romanized as ‘Alīābād-e Moʿīnī; also known as ‘Alīābād-e Moeenī) is a village in Taham Rural District, in the Central District of Zanjan County, Zanjan Province, Iran. At the 2006 census, its population was 12, in 5 families.

References 

Populated places in Zanjan County